Oil-lamp clocks are clocks consisting of a graduated glass reservoir to hold oil - usually whale oil, which burned cleanly and evenly - supplying the fuel for a built-in lamp. As the level in the reservoir dropped, it provided a rough measure of the passage of time.

The principle behind such a time-keeping device is that it measure a quantity that either decreases or increases at a constant rate. Lamps or candles, burning fuel at a steady pace, fit this category, and as a bonus produce useful light. Hourglasses depend on the steady draining of fine sand through a small aperture. Water clocks or clepsydra measure a gain or loss of water by using drops of uniform size and frequency. The Persian fenjaan made use of the constant time it took for the sinking of a floating bowl with a hole in its underside.

It is unknown when or where the oil-lamp clock was first introduced. This clock was mainly used during the mid-18th century.

See also
Candle clock
Water clock
Hourglass

References

Clocks